James Laidlaw Maxwell Jr. (1876 – 12 August 1951) was a pioneering modern English Presbyterian medical missionary to Formosa (Taiwan) and China. He was the son of James Laidlaw Maxwell Sr.. 

In 1923, he was appointed secretary of the China Medical Missionary Association. He died of malaria in Hangchow in 1951.

References

1876 births
1951 deaths
English Presbyterian missionaries
Presbyterian missionaries in Taiwan
Presbyterian missionaries in China
Deaths from malaria
British expatriates in Taiwan
Infectious disease deaths in the People's Republic of China
Christian medical missionaries